An Elusive Science: The Troubling History of Education Research is a history of American education research written by Ellen Condliffe Lagemann and published by University of Chicago Press in 2000.

Further reading

External links 

 

2000 non-fiction books
American non-fiction books
English-language books
History books about education
University of Chicago Press books